Ngloram Airport  is an airport in Cepu, Central Java, Indonesia.

In February 2018, the Ministry of Transportation announced that they had budgeted  to extend the airport's runway and to improve supporting facilities. There was a plan to rename the airport to Abdurrahman Wahid Airport, named after former Indonesian 4th President and often hailed as "Father of Indonesian Pluralism". Citilink inaugurated flights from Jakarta on 26 November 2021.

Airlines and destinations

Passenger

References

Airports in Central Java